Cambridge High School is a public high school in Cambridge, Ohio, United States.  It is the only high school in the Cambridge City School District. Athletic teams compete as the Cambridge Bobcats in the Ohio High School Athletic Association as a member of the Buckeye 8 Athletic League as well as the Ohio Valley Athletic Conference.

OHSAA State Championships

 Boys Golf – 1994

Notable alumni
Geno Ford - former men's basketball coach for the Kent State Golden Flashes and Bradley Braves
Doug Donley - former wide receiver for the Dallas Cowboys

References

External links
 School website

High schools in Guernsey County, Ohio
Public high schools in Ohio
Cambridge, Ohio